The 2003–04 Midland Football Combination season was the 67th in the history of Midland Football Combination, a football competition in England.

Premier Division

The Premier Division featured 18 clubs which competed in the division last season, along with three new clubs:
Brocton, joined from the Midland Football League
Dudley Sports, promoted from Division One
Shifnal Town, relegated from the Midland Football Alliance

League table

References

2003–04
9